National Highway 361H, commonly referred to as NH 361H is a national highway in  India. It is a spur road of National Highway 61. NH-361H traverses the state of Maharashtra in India.

Route 

Parali, Dharmapuri, Pangaon, Renapur.

Junctions  

 NH 361F Terminal near Parli.
  near Dharmapuri.
  Terminal near Renapur.

See also 

 List of National Highways in India
 List of National Highways in India by state

References

External links 

 NH 361H on OpenStreetMap

National highways in India
National Highways in Maharashtra